

Oskar Kummetz (21 July 1891 – 17 December 1980) was an admiral with the Kriegsmarine during World War II. From Kaholmen Blücher was hit by two torpedoes and she sank 84 meters below the sound. 

Along with hundreds of other survivors, including Generalmajor Erwin Engelbrecht, Kummetz was detained by Norwegian guardsmen at a farm near Drøbak on 9 April, before the Germans arrived and they were abandoned by their captors.

On March 1, 1944, Kummetz became the Commander-in-Chief of Naval High Command Baltic Sea in Kiel. On September 16, 1944 he was promoted to Generaladmiral. In the final months of the war, Kummetz was responsible for Operation Hannibal, the evacuation of German refugees and military personnel from Courland, East Prussia, West Prussia and Pomerania through the Baltic Sea.

Oskar Kummetz died on 17 December 1980 at the age of 89.

Awards
 Iron Cross (1914) 2nd Class (30 June 1916) & 1st Class (27 September 1919)
 Honour Cross for Combatants (January 1935)
 Wehrmacht Long Service Award 1st to 4th Class (2 October 1936)
 Magyar Köztársasági Érdemrend (Commander of the Hungarian Order of Merit) (20 August 1938)
 Clasp to the Iron Cross (1939) 2nd Class (14 October 1939) & 1st Class (12 April 1940)
 Memel Medal (14 March 1940)
 High Seas Fleet Badge (5 February 1942)
 Knight's Cross of the Iron Cross on 18 January 1941 as Konteradmiral and leader of the Kampfgruppe Oslo

References

Citations

Bibliography

 Dörr, Manfred (1995). Die Ritterkreuzträger der Überwasserstreitkräfte der Kriegsmarine, Band 1: A-K (in German). Osnabrück, Germany: Biblio Verlag. .
 
 

1891 births
1980 deaths
People from Działdowo County
Imperial German Navy personnel of World War I
Reichsmarine personnel
General admirals of the Kriegsmarine
Recipients of the Knight's Cross of the Iron Cross
World War II prisoners of war held by Norway
German prisoners of war in World War II held by the United Kingdom
People from East Prussia